Terrance Bailey (born July 3, 1965) is a former American basketball player who led NCAA Division I in scoring as a junior in 1985–86. A native of Newark, New Jersey, Bailey played at Wagner College for four years and established himself as one of the Northeast Conference's all-time greatest players.

Bailey played in 110 career games and scored a conference record 2,591 points, nearly 300 more than the next closest player. In his NCAA-leading junior season, he averaged 29.4 points per game, was named the Northeast Conference Player of the Year, an honorable mention All-American and was in his second of an unmatched three consecutive first team all-conference seasons. He once had back-to-back 40 point games and was named Sports Illustrated's Player of the Week. The New York Metropolitan Basketball Writers Association twice named him to their All-Met team. After his collegiate career ended, Bailey was selected in the second round (42nd overall) of the 1987 NBA Draft by the Atlanta Hawks but never got to play in the league.  He then played overseas, notably with the Presto Tivolis, in the Philippine Basketball Association in 1989.

Today, he lives in Trenton where he works as a pre-school teacher.

See also
List of NCAA Division I men's basketball season scoring leaders
List of NCAA Division I men's basketball career scoring leaders

References

1965 births
Living people
American expatriate basketball people in the Philippines
American men's basketball players
Atlanta Hawks draft picks
Basketball players from Trenton, New Jersey
Basketball players from Newark, New Jersey
Ewing High School (New Jersey) alumni
Great Taste Coffee Makers players
People from Ewing Township, New Jersey
Philippine Basketball Association imports
Shooting guards
Wagner Seahawks men's basketball players